Senia Point is an ice-covered point 9 nautical miles (17 km) south of Cape Selborne, marking the north side of the entrance to Couzens Bay on the west side of Ross Ice Shelf. Named by Advisory Committee on Antarctic Names (US-ACAN) for B. Senia, master of the cargo vessels USNS Mizar during Operation Deepfreeze 1962 and USNS Mirfak during Operation Deepfreeze 1963.

Headlands of Antarctica
Shackleton Coast